John Grenville Bates Sr (August 20, 1880 – February 2, 1944) was a co-founder of the American Kennel Club and former President and Show Chairman of the Westminster Kennel Club Dog Show. He won back-to-back dog shows with his Irish Terrier Pendley Calling of Blarney in 1930 and 1931. He was on the front cover of TIME Magazine Volume XXXI, No. 8.

Early life

Bates was born to Alfred Willard Bates and Catherine Cephise Towar, the youngest of four boys.

References 

1880 births
1944 deaths